The Point Addis Marine National Park is a protected marine national park located near Anglesea on the Surf Coast region of Victoria, Australia. The   marine park extends along  of coastline east of Anglesea, around Point Addis to the eastern end of Bells Beach and offshore  to the limit of Victorian waters.

See also

 Protected areas of Victoria

References

External links

Marine parks in Victoria (Australia)
Coastline of Victoria (Australia)
Protected areas of Bass Strait
Parks of Barwon South West (region)